Inspector Balram is a 1991 Malayalam film directed by I. V. Sasi, scripted by T. Damodaran, and starring Mammootty. It is a sequel to the 1986 film Aavanazhi and was followed by a sequel, Balram vs. Taradas, in 2006.

The movie was produced and distributed by Liberty Productions. The film was a commercial success and ran over than 240 days at box office.

Synopsis
Four years after the events of Aavanazhi, Balram is now married to Seetha. They have a daughter and live a normal life. Seetha is then killed by Dulabribai's men, and Balram sends his daughter to be taken care of by nuns along with the help of his superior officer Madhavan. Balram faces his enemies, including Indira Shankar and Sayed Mohammad Shah, and Preethi avenges her father's death.

Cast
 Mammootty as Circle Inspector Balram
 Kiran Kumar as Sayed Mohammed Shah
 Murali as City Police Commissioner Madhavan Nair IPS
 Geetha as Seetha
 Urvashi as Preethi Pillai
 Jagadish as Sudhakaran
 M. G. Soman as Sahadevan
 Kalpana as Sub Inspector Dakshayani
 Kundara Johny as CI Alex George
 Vincent as Customs Officer Nambiar
 Kunchan as SI Radhakrishnan aka "Shamshyam" Vasu 
 Augustine as Sub Inspector Ummer
 Ramu as Siddique 
 Kanakalatha as Madhavan's Wife
 V. K. Sreeraman as Hussain Sahib
 Bheeman Raghu as D'Cruz Pereira 
 M. S. Thripunithura as Krishna Pillai 
 Ragini as Rajamma 
 Kollam Thulasi as Home Minister 
 Vineeth Kumar as Jithu

Box office
The film was commercial success, and it attained cult status.

References

External links
 

1990s Malayalam-language films
Indian crime action films
Films about organised crime in India
Indian gangster films
1990s crime action films
1991 films
Films shot in Thalassery
Fictional portrayals of the Kerala Police
Films with screenplays by T. Damodaran
Indian sequel films
Balram2
Films scored by Shyam (composer)
Films directed by I. V. Sasi